Grady is a city in Lincoln County, Arkansas, United States. The population was 449 at the 2010 census, down from 523 at the 2000 census. It is included in the Pine Bluff, Arkansas Metropolitan Statistical Area.

Geography
Grady is located in northeastern Lincoln County at  (34.079551, -91.700722), along U.S. Route 65.

Demographics

2020 census

As of the 2020 United States census, there were 305 people, 178 households, and 91 families residing in the city.

2000 census
As of the census of 2000, there were 523 people, 184 households, and 142 families residing in the city. The racial makeup of the city was 31.36% White, 65.77% Black or African American, 0.19% Asian, 1.72% from other races, and 0.96% from two or more races. 2.87% of the population were Hispanic or Latino of any race.

There were 184 households, out of which 34.8% had children under the age of 18 living with them, 49.5% were married couples living together, 21.2% had a female householder with no husband present, and 22.8% were non-families. 20.7% of all households were made up of individuals, and 4.9% had someone living alone who was 65 years of age or older. The average household size was 2.84 and the average family size was 3.32.

In the city, the population was spread out, with 33.5% under the age of 18, 9.2% from 18 to 24, 23.1% from 25 to 44, 19.5% from 45 to 64, and 14.7% who were 65 years of age or older. The median age was 34 years. For every 100 females, there were 97.4 males.  For every 100 females age 18 and over, there were 93.3 males.

The median income for a household in the city was $22,321, and the median income for a family was $24,500. Males had a median income of $26,250 versus $20,313 for females. The per capita income for the city was $11,679. About 33.6% of families and 38.8% of the population were below the poverty line, including 51.3% of those under age 18 and 28.3% of those age 65 or over.

Government and infrastructure
Arkansas Department of Correction operates the Cummins Unit and the Varner Unit in Varner, an unincorporated area in Lincoln County, near Grady.

Education
The Star City School District operates public schools serving Grady. Its high school is Star City High School.

Previously Grady Public Schools operated public schools. In 2004 the Arkansas Legislature approved a law that forced school districts with fewer than 350 students apiece to consolidate with other districts. As a result, on July 1, 2004, the Grady School District was merged into the Star City district.

References

Cities in Arkansas
Cities in Lincoln County, Arkansas
Cities in Pine Bluff metropolitan area